Moisés Mamani Colquehuanca (30 August 1969 — 14 August 2020) was a Peruvian Fujimorist politician who served in the Peruvian Congress for the Puno constituency from 2016 till his death in 2020.

Life
He is known for instigating the Kenjivideos scandal of 2018 by revealing films of opposition legislators offering to help then-President Pedro Pablo Kuczynski avoid impeachment in exchange for political favors.

Mamani was born in Moho, Puno, and died, aged 50, in Lima. His death was reportedly from complications from COVID-19 during the COVID-19 pandemic in Peru.

References

External links
 News articles about Mamani at El Comercio 

21st-century Peruvian politicians
Members of the Congress of the Republic of Peru
People from Puno Region
Fujimorista politicians
Deaths from the COVID-19 pandemic in Peru
1969 births
2020 deaths